John Granville Liggins (26 March 1906 – 1976) was an English-born footballer who played as a centre forward. He played in The Football League for Leicester City and Burnley.

In the 1934–35 season he scored four league goals for Leicester.

References

1906 births
1976 deaths
People from Altrincham
Association football forwards
Rotherham United F.C. players
Mossley A.F.C. players
Hyde United F.C. players
Leicester City F.C. players
Burnley F.C. players
Shrewsbury Town F.C. players
Worksop Town F.C. players
English Football League players
English footballers